Cosmopolite may  refer to:

 Cosmopolite (album) a 1956 album by Benny Carter
 Cosmopolite (butterfly) (Vanessa cardui), also known as the painted lady
 Kosmopoliet, launched in 1854, said to have been the first Dutch clipper
 World citizen, one who eschews traditional geopolitical divisions derived from national citizenship

See also 
 Cosmo (disambiguation)
 Cosmopolitan (disambiguation)
 Cosmopolites, a weevil genus